Bryan Thompson may refer to:

 Bryan Thompson (designer) (born 1974), American automotive and freelance designer
 Bryan Thompson (rower), Canadian lightweight rower
 Bryan Thompson (racing driver) in 1969 Australian Touring Car Championship

See also
Brian Thompson (disambiguation)